Prince Paulo Kafeero born Paul Job Kafeero (12 July 1970 - 17 May 2007) was a celebrated Ugandan Afro-folk singer. During his career as a musician, Kafeero won several prestigious awards. In both 2003 and 2004, Kafeero won the PAM Awards for best Kadongo Kamu artist/group.

Education
In 1977, Kafeero began school at Nkokonjjeru Demonstration Primary School, and went on to Ngogwe Baskerville secondary school, walking the four kilometres there each day.  In the same year he began school, his father left the family.  Because of his mother's opposition to his interest in music, he went to stay in the nearby village of Masaba with his older sister Grace and her husband.  Grace's husband intermittently paid his school fees after his father's abandonment.  With no secure source of school fees, Kafeero did not finish secondary school.  He earned money by making bricks, cultivating beans, selling used clothes, and tailoring.  Kafeero's father gave no further support and had no contact with his son until he became famous.

Discography
Muvubuka Munnange
Abatunda Ebyokulya
Ekijjankunene, part III
Temukyasaga
Kiwenenya Amazina
Ebintu Byomuko
Tulera Birerya
Walumbe Zzaaya
Obutamatira
Ekyali Ekintu Kyange
Gwe Musika
Dunia Weeraba
Edduma Lye'mbaga
Omwana W'omuzungu
Baabo Bagambe
Nantabulirirwa
Kampala Mu Kooti
Dipo Naziggala
Moviour
Bamutalira
Olulimi Lwange
Nsonda Nnya
Emomboze
Eyali Amanyi Okupanga
Galenzi Mmwe
Musaayi Gwange
Lucia
Singa Nalinze
Bisirikirwa
Tusuza emyoyo
Esawa yokuzaawa
Mwanyinaze

See also
 List of African musicians
 List of Ugandan musicians

References

External links
"Listen To All Paulo Kafeero's Songs"
"Kafeero’s unexplainable kadongo kamu muse"
"Paul Kafeero's widow Barret-Gaines to speak at Harvard University "
"One Little Guitar: The Words of Paul Job Kafeero"

21st-century Ugandan male singers
People from Buikwe District
1970 births
2007 deaths
Kumusha